The First Generation is a compilation album by British band Sigue Sigue Sputnik, released in 1990 (see 1990 in music).

Track listing
 "Rockit Miss USA (Black and Bluski)" - 6:57
 "Sex Bomb Boogie (Tick Tock and Boom!)" - 4:07
 "21st Century Boy (TV Messiah)" - 3:59
 "Teenage Thunder (Teenage Mutants)" - 4:53
 "She's My Man (She Wolves of the S.S.S)" - 4:57
 "Love Missile F1-11 (A Clockwork Sputnik)" - 4:54
 "Jayne Mansfield (Blitzkrieg Baby)" - 4:05
 "Ultra Violence (Senseless Sex and Gratuitous Violence)" - 5:43
 "Krush Groove Girls (The Meat Hookers of Love)" - 4:23
 "Rockajet Baby (This Stuff'll Kill Ya)" - 4:27
 "Rebel Rebel (Zigger Zagger)" (live) David Bowie song- 4:35

References

1990 compilation albums
Sigue Sigue Sputnik albums